The Slayana World Tour (sometimes referred to as the Slayana In These Streets Tour) is the third headlining concert tour by American singer Brandy. The tour was announced on February 23, 2016, and started on June 15, 2016 in Auckland, New Zealand, visiting Europe and Oceania, while performing in twelve cities in June and July. The tour's title is in reference to Norwood's fan nickname — itself a pun on the word "slay" and her middle name Rayana — as well as her own label Slayana Records, which she launched and released her first single "Beggin & Pleadin" on in 2016.

Background
In early 2016, Brandy released "Beggin & Pleadin" for free on the music streaming service SoundCloud, with an accompanying music video on her official YouTube. Soon after, the tour was announced via Musicalize and Norwood's website. Four shows were announced in the United Kingdom, and on April 25, four more shows were added in New Zealand and Australia. An additional four shows were announced for Germany later on. Rehearsals took place in Los Angeles, California, under the direction of Frank Gatson The July 1, 2, and 3 tour dates were postponed due to Norwood's hospitalization.

Setlist

"Chicago Intro"
"Afrodisiac"
"I Thought"
"What About Us?
"Full Moon"
"Who Is She 2 U"
"Top of the World"
"Sittin' Up In My Room"
"In These Streets (Interlude)"
"Baby"
"Best Friend"
"I Wanna Be Down" (contains elements of "I Wanna Be Down (Remix)")
"The Boy Is Mine"
"Angel in Disguise"
"Without You"
"Necessary"
"Almost Doesn't Count"
"Have You Ever?"
"Magic"/"Human Nature"
"Focus (Dance Interlude)"
Whitney Houston Tribute
"How Will I Know"
"I Wanna Dance With Somebody (Who Loves Me)"
"Exhale (Shoop Shoop)"
"Wildest Dreams"
"Put It Down"
Encore
 "Beggin & Pleadin"

Notes
"Without You" was only performed during the London show.
"I'm Your Baby Tonight" was performed as the first song in the Whitney Houston tribute during the Stuttgart show.
"Exhale (Shoop Shoop)" was excluded during the Stuttgart show.

Shows

Cancelled shows

References

2016 concert tours
Brandy Norwood